Elections to East Dunbartonshire Council were held on 3 May 2007, the same day as the other Scottish local government elections and the Scottish Parliament general election. This election was the first to use eight new multi-member wards created as a result of the Local Governance (Scotland) Act 2004. Each ward returned three councillors elected under the single transferable vote form of proportional representation, replacing the previous 24 single-member wards, which had used the plurality (first past the post) system of election.

Election results

Ward results

Milngavie

Bearsden North

Bearsden South

Campsie and Kirkintilloch North

Bishopbriggs North and Torrance

Bishopbriggs South

Lenzie and Kirkintilloch South

Kirkintilloch East and Twechar

Aftermath
Although the SNP were elected as the largest group (winning their first ever councillors on East Dunbartonshire Council), the administration was formed by a Labour/Conservative coalition. Labour councillors Rhondda Geekie and Alex Hannah became Leader and Provost respectively, with the positions of Depute Leader and Depute Provost being filled by Conservative councillors Billy Hendry and Anne Jarvis. However, following the death of Alex Hannah in April 2009, LibDem councillor Eric Gotts was appointed as Provost.

In December 2009, Lib Dem representation increased briefly to 4, following Ashay Ghai's win in the Bearsden South by-election caused by the resignation of the Conservatives' Simon Hutchison. However, their numbers reverted to 3 in June 2011, when Lib Dem councillor Duncan Cumming resigned from the party citing issues relating to the Liberal Democrats' role in the UK coalition government, sitting thereafter as an Independent.

Changes since 2007 Election
A by-election was held to fill the vacancy which arose with the death of Labour Cllr Alex Hannah on 12 April 2009. The seat was held by Labour's Alan Moir on 4 June 2009
A by-election was held to fill the vacancy which arose following the resignation of Conservative Cllr Simon Hutchison on 29 October 2009. The seat was won by the Liberal Democrats Ashay Ghai on 10 December 2009.
†On 10 July 2011, Bearsden North Cllr Duncan Cumming resigned from the Liberal Democrats and thereafter sat as an Independent.

By-elections since 2007 Election

Bishopbriggs South

Bearsden South

References

2007
2007 Scottish local elections
21st century in East Dunbartonshire